The Hood County Courthouse Historic District  in Granbury, Hood County, Texas encompasses 12 acres of land. The principal building in and the focal point of the district is the historic Hood County Courthouse built in 1890–1891. Other major buildings include the 1885 Hood County Jailhouse, the 1885 First National Bank Building, the 1891 building which formerly housed the Hood County News, the 1893 Aston-Landers Saloon Building, the 1893 Nutt Brothers Building, and the 1886 Granbury Opea House. On June 5, 1974, the district was added to the National Register of Historic Places. The nomination form called it "one of the most complete nineteenth century courthouse squares in Texas." The district is also recognized as a State Antiquities Landmark and includes several Recorded Texas Historic Landmarks.

Hood County Courthouse

The historic Hood County Courthouse is located in the block bounded by East Bridge Street on the north, North Crockett Street on the east, East Pearl Street on the south and North Houston Street on the west and has an entrance on each side except the north one. It is the fifth courthouse building to occupy this site and was built of Brazos limestone by contractors Moodie and Ellis between 1890 and 1891. It was designed in the Second Empire style by noted Texas courthouse architect Wesley Clark Dodson of Waco (1829–1914). The building features 3 main stories plus an attic floor under an elaborate mansard roof system. The imposing 3-story central clock tower completed after the rest of the building required reinforcement in 1969. In 2000 the exterior of the building was restored. In 2008 a grant was received to restore the interior including restoring the district courtroom to its original 2-story configuration.

Nellie Gray Robertson, first female county attorney in Texas, was elected to the post for Hood County in 1918, and practiced in the courthouse building.

See also

Sons of the Republic of Texas
Daughters of the Republic of Texas
Sons of Confederate Veterans
Daughters of Confederate Veterans
Daughters of the American Revolution (D.A.R.)
Sons of the American Revolution (S.A.R.)
National Register of Historic Places listings in Hood County, Texas
Recorded Texas Historic Landmarks in Hood County

References

External links

Second Empire architecture in Texas
Victorian architecture in Texas
Buildings and structures in Hood County, Texas
County courthouses in Texas
Wesley Clark Dodson buildings
Clock towers in Texas
Historic districts on the National Register of Historic Places in Texas
National Register of Historic Places in Hood County, Texas
Courthouses on the National Register of Historic Places in Texas
1891 establishments in Texas
Government buildings completed in 1891